KZMY (103.5 FM, "My 103.5") is a radio station licensed to serve Bozeman, Montana.  The station is owned by Townsquare Media, licensed to Townsquare License, LLC. It airs a hot adult contemporary music format.

All Townsquare Media Bozeman studios are located at 125 West Mendenhall Street, downtown Bozeman. KXLB, KMMS-FM, KZMY, and KISN all share a transmitter site on Green Mountain, east of Bozeman.

The station was assigned the KZMY call letters by the Federal Communications Commission on June 20, 2002.

Ownership
In February 2008, Colorado-based GAPWEST Broadcasting completed the acquisition of 57 radio stations in 13 markets in the Pacific Northwest-Rocky Mountain region from Clear Channel Communications.  The deal, valued at a reported $74 million, included six Bozeman stations, seven in Missoula and five in Billings. Other stations in the deal are located in Shelby, Montana, and in Casper and Cheyenne, Wyoming, plus Pocatello and Twin Falls, Idaho, and Yakima, Washington.  GapWest was folded into Townsquare Media on August 13, 2010.

References

External links
KZMY official website

ZMY
Hot adult contemporary radio stations in the United States
Gallatin County, Montana
Radio stations established in 1969
1969 establishments in Montana
Townsquare Media radio stations